Bowles Hollowell Conner & Co. (BHC) was a leading middle market investment banking firm headquartered in Charlotte, North Carolina.  The firm was founded in 1975 by Erskine Bowles and Thomas Hollowell.

In April 1998, Bowles Hollowell was acquired by First Union.  The former Bowles Hollowell and would later constitute a significant portion of the investment banking operations of Wachovia after its acquisition of First Union.  Bowles Hollowell had assets of $18 million as of January 1, 1998.

Bowles Hollowell was active in the private equity and leveraged buyouts. The firm had represented more than 75 different private equity firms in the mid-1990s and Bowles Hollowell actively covered more than 275 private equity firms across the United States.  Additionally, Bowles Hollowell provided advisory services to middle market companies and large corporations.  The firm had capabilities in a variety of industries including automotive, food products and distribution, building products, technology, textile, healthcare and aerospace & defense.

References

Hollowell returning to dealmaking with Fidus. Charlotte Business Journal, March 28, 2005

Wells Fargo
Defunct financial services companies of the United States
Financial services companies established in 1975
Financial services companies disestablished in 1998
1998 mergers and acquisitions
Former investment banks of the United States
Companies based in Charlotte, North Carolina
1975 establishments in North Carolina
1998 disestablishments in North Carolina